Native Americans have served in state legislatures, with several interruptions, since Greenwood LeFlore was elected to the Mississippi lower house in 1841. Twenty-one states (out of 50) have yet to elect or appoint any Native American state legislators. This list does not include Native Hawaiians.

Nationwide

Alaska 

 first Alaska Native men elected to the Alaska House of Representatives: John E. Curtis (Iñupiaq), Charles E. Fagerstrom (Inupiaq), James Hoffman (Yup'ik), Axel C. Johnson (Yup'ik), John Nusunginya (Iñupiaq) (1959)
 first Alaska Native men elected to the Alaska Senate: Bill Beltz (Inupiaq), Frank Peratrovich (Tlingit), Eben Hopson (Iñupiaq) (1959)
 first Alaska Native man to serve as Alaska Senate President: Bill Beltz (Inupiaq) (1959)
 first Alaska Native woman elected to the Alaska House of Representives: Brenda Itta (Iñupiaq) (1974)
 first Alaska Native woman elected to the Alaska Senate: Georgianna Lincoln (Gwich'in) (1993)
 first Alaska Native to serve as Speaker of the Alaska House: Bryce Edgmon (Yup'ik) (2017)

Arizona 

 first Native American man elected to the Arizona House of Representatives: Lloyd House (Navajo, Oneida) (1967)
 first Native American man elected to the Arizona Senate: Arthur J. Hubbard Sr. (Navajo) (1972)
 first Native American women elected to the Arizona House of Representatives: Debra Lynn Norris (Navajo, Tohono O'odham) and Sally Ann Gonzales (Yaqui) (1997)
 first Native American woman elected to the Arizona Senate: Jamescita Peshlakai (Navajo) (2016)

Arkansas 
first Native American man elected to the Arkansas House of Representatives: Jeremy Hutchinson (Blackfoot) (2000)

first Native American woman elected to the Arkansas House of Representatives: Donna Hutchinson (Blackfoot) (2007)

California 

 first Native American elected to the California State Assembly and first openly gay Native American California legislator: Todd Gloria (Tlingit) (2016)
 first California Native American elected to the California State Assembly: James Ramos (Serrano, Cahuilla) (2018)

Colorado 

 first Native American elected to the Colorado House of Representatives: Ben Nighthorse Campbell (Cheyenne) (1983)
 first Native American elected to the Colorado Senate: Suzanne Williams (Comanche) (2004)

Idaho 

 first Native American man elected to the Idaho House of Representatives: Joseph Garry (Coeur d'Alene) (1956)
 first Native American woman elected to the Idaho House of Representatives: Jeanne Givens (Coeur d'Alene) (1985)

Illinois 

 first Native American elected to the Illinois General Assembly: Donne Trotter (Choctaw) (1988)
 first Native American elected to the Illinois Senate: Donne Trotter (Choctaw) (1993)

Kansas 

 first Native American woman elected to the Kansas House of Representatives: Ponka-We Victors (Ponca, Tohono O'odham) (2010)
 first transgender Native American state legislator: Stephanie Byers (Chickasaw) (2021)

Kentucky 

 first Native American elected to the Kentucky House of Representatives: Reginald Meeks (Cherokee) (2000)

Maine 

 first Native Americans appointed to the Maine House of Representatives (non-voting tribal representatives): Francis Loran and John Neptune (Penobscot) (1823)
 first Native American elected to the Maine House of Representatives (non-voting): Henry John Bear (Maliseet) (2013)

Massachusetts 
first Native American elected to the Massachusetts Legislature: Watson F. Hammond (Montauk) (1837)

Michigan 

 first Native American to be elected to the Michigan Legislature: Cora Reynolds Anderson (Ojibwe) (1924)

Minnesota 

 first Native American man elected to the Minnesota Senate: Skip Finn (Ojibwe) (1991)
 first Native American woman elected to the Minnesota House of Representatives and first lesbian and two-spirit Native American state legislator: Susan Allen (Lakota) (2001)
 first Native American woman elected to the Minnesota Senate: Mary Kunesh (Lakota) (2020)

Mississippi 

 first Native American in the Mississippi House and State Senate: Greenwood LeFlore (Choctaw) (1841)
 first Native American woman elected to the Mississippi House of Representatives: Carolyn Crawford (Ojibwe) (2012)

Montana 

 first Native American elected to the Montana House of Representaives: Dolly Smith Custer Akers (Assiniboine) (1932)
 first Native American woman elected to the Montana Senate: Sharon Stewart-Peregoy (Crow) (2008)
 first openly gay Native American elected to the Montana Legislature: Donavon Hawk (2020)

Nebraska 

 first Native American elected to the Nebraska Legislature: Tom Brewer (Lakota) (2016)

Nevada 
first Native American man elected to the Nevada Legislature: Dewey Sampson (Paiute) (1938)

first Native American Speaker of the Nevada House: John Oceguera (Paiute) (2000)

first Native American woman elected to the Nevada State Assembly: Shea Backus (2018)

New Mexico 

 first Native American man elected to the New Mexico Senate: Tom Lee (Navajo) (1966)
 first Native American woman elected to the New Mexico House of Representatives: Lynda Lovejoy (1988)

North Carolina 

 first Native American elected to the North Carolina House of Representatives: Henry Ward Oxedine (Lumbee) (1973)
 first Native American elected to the North Carolina House of Representatives in the 20th century: Charles Graham (Lumbee) (2011)

North Dakota 
first Native American elected to the North Dakota Legislature: Arthur Raymond (Lakota) (1970)

first Native American woman elected to the North Dakota House of Representatives: Ruth Buffalo (Mandan, Hidatsa, and Arikara) (2018)

Oklahoma 

 first Native American woman elected to the Oklahoma Legislature: Helen TeAta Gale Cole (Chickasaw) (1979)
 first gay Native American elected to the Oklahoma Legislature and possibly nationwide: Al McAffrey (Choctaw) (2006)

Oregon 

 first Native American elected to the Oregon House of Representatives: Jackie Taylor (Potawatomi) (1991)

Pennsylvania 

 first Native American elected to the Pennsylvania House of Representatives: Barbara McIlvaine Smith (Sac and Fox) (2007)

South Dakota 

 first Native American man elected to the South Dakota Legislature: Pat Flynn Jr. (Lakota) (1970)
 first Native American woman elected to the South Dakota Legislature: Theresa Two Bulls (Lakota) (2004)
 first Native American elected as South Dakota Senate Minority Leader: Troy Heinert (Lakota)
 first Republican Native American woman elected to the South Dakota House of Representatives: Tamara St. John (Dakota) (2019)

Tennessee 

 first Native American elected to the Tennessee House of Representatives: Bryan Terry (Choctaw) (2015)

Utah 

 first Native American woman elected to the Utah Legislature: Angela Romero (Assiniboine) (2013)

Washington 

 first Native American man to be elected to the Washington Legislature: William Bishop (Snohomish) (1898)
 first Native American man to be elected to the Washington State Senate: William Bishop (Snohomish) (1919)
 first Native American woman elected to the Washington Legislature: Lois Stratton (Spokane) (1971)
 first Alaska Native woman elected to the Washington Legislature: Debra Lekanoff (Tlingit, Unangax̂) (2019)

Wisconsin 

 first Native American elected to the Wisconsin State Assembly: Alonzo D. Dick (Brothertown) (1849)

Wyoming 

 first Native American man elected to the Wyoming Legislature: Scotty Ratliff (Eastern Shoshone) (1980)
 first Native American woman elected to the Wyoming Legislature and first Native American elected to the Wyoming Senate: Affie Ellis (Navajo) (2016)
 first Native American woman elected to the Wyoming House of Representatives: Andi Clifford (Northern Arapaho) (2018)

References 

legislators
Lists of firsts
State legislators of the United States
first